Bahçeköy (literally "garden village") is a Turkish place name that may refer to the following places in Turkey:

 Bahçeköy, Bolu, a village in the district of Bolu, Bolu Province
 Bahçeköy, Çermik
 Bahçeköy, Dicle
 Bahçeköy, Düzce
 Bahçeköy, Karacasu, a village in the district of Karacasu, Aydın Province
 Bahçeköy, Keşan
 Bahçeköy, Sarıyer, a neighborhood of Sarıyer district in Istanbul Province, Turkey
 Bahçeköy, Tavas